Arekw or O'rekw (also, Oruk) is a former Yurok settlement in Humboldt County, California.

References

Former settlements in Humboldt County, California
Former Native American populated places in California
Yurok villages